The Poribacteria-1 RNA motif is a conserved RNA structure that was discovered by bioinformatics.
The Poribacteria-1 motif is found only in the candidate bacterial phylum known as Poribacteria, and all 6 Poribacteria-1 RNAs are actually found in one organism, Candidatus Poribacteria sp. WGA-4E.  All but one of these RNAs occur within roughly 6 kilobases of genomic DNA, and each of the 5 RNAs occurs between a different pair of protein-coding genes.  This arrangement could suggest that the motif functions on the level of single-stranded DNA as attC sites that are part of an integron.  It is also possible that Poribacteria-1 RNAs are cis-regulatory elements that regulate genes that happen to often be nearby to one another, or that the RNAs function in trans as small RNAs.

References

Non-coding RNA